Autzen Stadium is an outdoor football stadium in the northwest United States, in Eugene, Oregon. Located north of the University of Oregon campus, it is the home field of the Oregon Ducks of the Pac-12 Conference. Opened  in 1967, the stadium has undergone several expansions. The official seating capacity is presently 54,000, however, the actual attendance regularly exceeds that figure.

History
Prior to 1967, the Ducks' on-campus stadium was Hayward Field, which they shared with the track and field team. However, by the late 1950s, it had become apparent that Hayward Field was no longer suitable for the football team. It seated only 22,500 people, making it one of the smallest in the University Division (now Division I), and only 9,000 seats were available to the general public. While nearly every seat was protected from the elements, it had little else going for it. The stadium was in such poor condition that coaches deliberately kept prospective recruits from seeing it. With the recognition that the football team had outgrown the campus facility and with popular support to play the entire home schedule in Eugene for the first time in school history, Oregon athletic director Leo Harris led a campaign to build a new stadium on  that the school had acquired for the purpose in the 1950s on his recommendation.

Designed by Skidmore, Owings & Merrill, the stadium was built within an artificial landfill (over the refuse) to eliminate the need for multilevel ramps. As a result, construction took just nine months and cost approximately $2.3 million. $250,000 was contributed by the Autzen Foundation, headed by Thomas E. Autzen (class of 1943), son of Portland lumberman and philanthropist Thomas J. Autzen (1888–1958), for whom the stadium was named. The elder Autzen was ironically an alumnus of Oregon archrival Oregon State University.

In 1967, Oregon hosted Colorado in Autzen Stadium's inaugural game, a 17–13 loss before 27,500 on September 23. Four weeks later on October 21, 16,000 saw Oregon's first win in the new facility; the 31–6 victory over Idaho was the only home win of the season.

The stadium alternates with Oregon State's Reser Stadium as host of the annual rivalry game with the Beavers.

Autzen hosted the inaugural Pac-12 Conference Championship game on December 2, 2011, as the Pac-12 North champion Ducks defeated the Pac-12 South champion UCLA Bruins.

Playing surface

Opened with natural grass in 1967, the field was switched to AstroTurf and lights were added for its third season in 1969. After seven years, it was replaced with new AstroTurf in 1976. Sand-based OmniTurf was installed in 1984 and 1991, and infilled NeXturf in 2001. The NeXturf was found to be overly slick when wet and lasted only one season, and was transferred to an intramural field. FieldTurf made its debut in Autzen in 2002, and was replaced in 2010.

With up to 8 feet (2.4 m) of gravel fill underneath the field, the original crown of the natural grass field was moderate, with the center of the field approximately one foot (0.30 m) higher than the sidelines. The crown was removed in 2010, and the surface is now flat.

Renovations
In 1982, a $650,000 meeting room complex, the Donald Barker Stadium Club, was opened on the east rim above the end zone. It gave the stadium its first meeting facilities, and was dedicated at the home opener in September.

A proposal to enclose the stadium within a dome was given serious consideration in 1985. New tax laws on contributions altered the feasibility, and the overall project was scaled back. In 1988, a $2.3 million renovation built a new press box on the south side of the stadium and converted the original north side press box to luxury suites. The renovation was designed by architecture firm Ellerbe Becket.

In 1995, the field was named Rich Brooks Field, after the Ducks' coach from 1977 to 1994. Brooks led Oregon to its first outright Pac-10 championship, and its first Rose Bowl appearance in 37 years, in his last season. Brooks left Oregon after the 1994 season to become head coach of the St. Louis Rams of the National Football League.

In 2002, a $90 million facelift and expansion added seating and luxury boxes to the south sideline, bringing the stadium seating capacity up to its current level.

In 2007, the large yellow "O" was added onto the south end of the stadium exterior when ESPN's College GameDay was on location. That season, "Gameday" originated two of its Saturday shows from Eugene.

It is the 39th largest video screen in the NCAA.

In 2010, the field was replaced with new FieldTurf that featured the new Pac-12 logo (even before the logo was officially revealed to the public). During the process, the crown was removed to make the field flat. In addition, new paneling was added to the walls surrounding the field.

In 2014, the east end-zone scoreboard was updated to include a digital screen, the addition of 150 flat screen monitors throughout the concessions areas, additional culinary options in the form of food trucks on the north side of the stadium, increased cell phone repeaters and an upgrade to the sound system. Additionally, the sideline wall graphics were updated from the new panels installed in the 2010 season.

In 2020 the east end-zone scoreboard was replaced with a new 186’ x 66’ video screen on the east end of the stadium, making it the largest video board in college football. The video board will also house a smaller outward-facing 47’ x 26’ video board visible to fans arriving to the stadium.

Stadium records
The highest attendance at Autzen was 60,055 on October 15, 2011, when the Ducks beat Arizona State, 41–27. This stands as the second largest crowd for a sporting event in the state of Oregon, with the largest being the CART Portland 200 Champ car event in 1993 (63,000).

From 1997 to 2001, the Ducks had a 24-game home winning streak at Autzen Stadium, which ended with a 49–42 loss to Stanford.
In 2011, the USC Trojans defeated the Ducks 38–35, ending a 21-game home winning streak as the Trojans handed Chip Kelly his first loss at Autzen as head coach.

Attendance

Sellout.  Conference Championship Game.  Attendance Record.  1 – Thursday Night Game.  2 – Friday Night Game. 3 – ESPN's College GameDay.

Location and configuration

The stadium is located just north of the Willamette River, next to Alton Baker Park. Students typically walk to the stadium from the University of Oregon campus over the Autzen Footbridge, which passes over the Willamette, then through Alton Baker Park.

Crowd noise
Autzen is known for its crowd noise.  Due to the stadium's relatively small footprint, the fans are very close to the action, and the field is sunken.  These factors contribute to the loudness of the stadium even though it is smaller than other 'noise comparable' stadiums.  According to many in the Pac-12, from Oregon's resurgence in the mid-1990s until the most recent expansion in 2002, Autzen was even louder because the noise reverberated all the way up the stadium and bounced back down to the field—the so-called "Autzen bounce."  Oregon officials say that any future expansions will trap more noise.

On October 27, 2007, during a 24–17 victory against the USC Trojans, a then-record crowd of 59,277 fans was recorded at 127.2 decibels. A similarly loud 31–27 upset of third-ranked Michigan in 2003 prompted Michigan Daily columnist J. Brady McCollough to write

Michigan coach Lloyd Carr later said that Autzen Stadium was the loudest stadium he'd ever been in.

In 2006, a Sporting News columnist named Autzen the most intimidating college football stadium in the nation.

Lee Corso of ESPN College Gameday frequently says, "Per person Autzen Stadium is the loudest stadium that I have ever been in my entire life!"

Longtime ABC sportscaster Keith Jackson called Autzen "Per square yard, the loudest stadium in the history of the planet."

Jahvid Best, a former starting running back for the Detroit Lions, visited Autzen while playing for the California Golden Bears in 2007.  He later said, "The biggest thing I remember about that game is the crowd. The crowd noise is crazy up there. Honestly, any other away game I don't really even hear the crowd. Oregon was the only place where it really got on my nerves."

Following the September 6, 2014 game against the Michigan State Spartans, Michigan sports reporter Mike Griffin of MLive.com accused Oregon of piping in artificial noise that contributed to the Ducks' victory over the Spartans.

Traditions
Since 1990, Don Essig, the stadium's PA announcer since 1968, has declared that "It never rains at Autzen Stadium" before each home game as the crowd chants along in unison. He often prefaces it with the local weather forecast, which quite often includes some chance of showers, but reminds fans that "we know the real forecast..." or "let's tell our friends from (visiting team name) the real forecast..." If rain is actually falling before the game, Essig will often dismiss it as "a light drizzle", or "liquid sunshine" but not actual rain by Oregon standards. Also, because of the use of Autzen Stadium and the University of Oregon campus in National Lampoon's Animal House, the toga party scene of the movie featuring the song "Shout" is played at the end of the third quarter, with the crowd dancing to the song.

Prior to the football team taking the field, a highlight video of previous games is shown on the jumbotron, nicknamed "Duckvision". The last highlight on the clip is almost always Kenny Wheaton's game-clinching 97-yard interception return for a touchdown against the Washington Huskies in 1994. "The Pick" is often seen as the turning point for Oregon football, which went on to the Rose Bowl that year and have enjoyed success for the most part ever since after years of losing records.

After the video, the team takes the field behind a motorcycle with the Oregon Duck riding on back to the strains of Mighty Oregon. This is followed by the north side of the stadium chanting "GO" with the south side chanting "DUCKS!".

After every Duck score and win, a train horn blares.  In addition, the Oregon Duck mascot does as many pushups as Oregon has points at that time.

ESPN College Gameday
ESPN's College GameDay program came to Eugene for games played in Autzen Stadium six straight years, from 2009 through 2014, the most of any other school during that period. Recently GameDay returned for a seventh time in 2018 against the Stanford Cardinal. Overall, GameDay has made eleven visits to Oregon, most recently in 2022 against the UCLA Bruins, and the Ducks have been a part of 28 GameDay broadcasts, either at Autzen or as a visiting team. Oregon has the eleventh most appearances, posting a  record.

Other uses
Autzen Stadium is the largest sports arena in the state of Oregon. In 1970, the San Francisco 49ers defeated the Denver Broncos 23-7 in an exhibition game at Autzen Stadium in front of a crowd of 26,238.

State high school football championship games were played at Autzen Stadium until 2006. It also hosts football camps, coaches' clinics, marching band competitions, and musical concerts.

Nitro Circus Live was held at the stadium in 2016 and 2018.

Concerts
The Grateful Dead used the stadium as a tour stop ten times between 1978 and 1994, including a 1987 show with Bob Dylan during which a portion of their collaborative live album entitled Dylan & the Dead was recorded.

In Film
It was also used as the location for the fictional Faber College football stadium in the 1978 movie, National Lampoon's Animal House.  There is a well-known geographical error made during a scene set inside the stadium when Pacific-10 conference banners can clearly be seen in the background, even though the fictional Faber College is supposed to be located in Tennessee as shown by the state flag in the hearing room for the Delta House probation case.

Soccer
On July 24, 2016, Autzen Stadium hosted a 2016 International Champions Cup match between Inter Milan and Paris Saint-Germain, which was won by Paris Saint-Germain by a score of 3-1.

See also
 List of NCAA Division I FBS football stadiums

References

External links

 
 Sports-Venue.com –  Autzen Stadium – Info and Photos
 Goducks.com – Official Autzen Stadium Information
Building Oregon: Architecture of Oregon and the Pacific Northwest includes images and documentation for University of Oregon buildings

College football venues
Oregon Ducks football venues
University of Oregon buildings
Skidmore, Owings & Merrill buildings
Sports venues in Eugene, Oregon
Sports venues completed in 1967
1967 establishments in Oregon